Gino Lettieri (born 23 December 1966) is a professional football manager who is the current  manager of Lithuanian  club FK Panevėžys. He is an Italian national, but was born in Switzerland.

Coaching career

1994–2006: Early career
Lettieri was the assistant coach of 1860 Munich from July 1994 to April 1997. He then became manager of Bayern Hof from 23 April 1997 to 30 June 2000. In the 1996–97 season, under Lettieri, Bayern Hof got two wins, one draw, and three losses to finish 15th in the Bayernliga. They finished in 10th place in the 1997–98 season, 14th in the 1998–99 season, and in fourth place in the 1999–2000 season. Then on 1 July 2000, Lettieri became manager of FC Augsburg In the Bayernliga, Augsburg finished fourth in the 2000–01 season and first in the 2001–02 season. On 20 June 2002, Bonner SC announced Lettieri as their new manager. He started on 1 July 2002. He finished the 2002–03 season in 12th season. He was in Bonn until 11 September 2003 when he joined then Bayernliga side SpVgg Bayreuth. His last match as Bonn's manager was a 2–0 loss to GFC Düren on 7 September 2003. He was in sixth place when he left Bonn. While at Bayreuth, during the 2003–04 season, he finished with a record of 11 wins, eight draws, and six losses to finish seventh in the Oberliga Bayern table. Bayreuth won promotion to the Regionalliga Süd during the 2004–05 season. They finished 10th in the 2005–06 season.

2006–10: Darmstadt, Wacker Burghausen, and Weiden
On 10 June 2006, Lettieri signed a two–year contract with SV Darmstadt 98. During his time at Darmstadt, he lost 1–0 in extra time in the German Cup. He was sacked on 6 October 2006. His final match was a 4–2 win against 1899 Hoffenheim on 29 September 2006. He finished with a record of three wins, no draws, and seven losses. On 2 January 2007, Wacker Burghausen appointed him as their manager. His first match was a 2–1 loss to Karlsruher SC on 21 January 2007. He left the club on 30 June 2007 when his contract expired. Wacker Burghausen finished in 17th place and were relegated. Six months later, on 11 December 2007, he was appointed manager of SpVgg Weiden. He finished the 2007–08 season with a record of six wins, four draws, and four losses. Weiden won promotion during the 2008–09 season, finishing in first place, finishing nine points ahead of TSV Aindling. He was with Weiden until 9 February 2010. His final match was a 1–0 win against 1. FC Nürnberg II on 13 December 2009.

2010–15: Wehen Wiesbaden, Arminia Bielefeld and Duisburg
On 9 February 2010, Gino Lettieri joined Wehen Wiesbaden of the 3. Liga. His first 3 matches in charge were all losses, but they managed to avoid relegation by eight points. On 21 October 2010, Lettieri signed a new contract keeping him at the club until 30 June 2013. During the 2010–11 season, Wehen Wiesbaden narrowly missed out on the promotion playoff by a single point. Wehen Wiesbaden started the 2011–12 season with a 2–1 win against Werder Bremen II on 23 July 2011. On 15 February 2012 with the club dangerously hanging round the relegation zone, SV Wehen sacked him, and replaced him with Peter Vollmann the next day. Lattieri finished with a record of 31 wins, 21 draws, and 26 losses. He then became assistant coach of Arminia Bielefeld from 2012 to 2014.

He joined MSV Duisburg as their manager on 21 May 2014. He made his debut in a 3–1 loss to Jahn Regensburg on 26 July 2016. During the 2014–15 season, Duisburg defeated 1. FC Nürnberg 1–0 in the first round of the German Cup. However, they lost to 1. FC Köln in the second round of the German Cup in a shootout after the match had finished in a 0–0 draw. Other results during the season includes a 4–3 win against 1. FSV Mainz 05 II on 6 August 2014, a 3–1 win against his former club Wehen Wiesbaden on 29 November 2014, a 4–2 loss to Arminia Bielefeld on 15 February 2015, and a 4–1 win against Borussia Dortmund II on 21 March 2015. On 16 May 2015, Duisburg won promotion to the 2. Bundesliga after defeating Holdtein Kiel 3–1. They had won it with a game to spare. They finished the season in second place. Duisburg started the 2015–16 league season with two draws and seven losses. They were also knocked out of the German Cup by FC Schalke 04 who had defeated Duisburg 5–0. Lettieri was relieved of his duties on 2 November 2015. His final match was a 1–0 loss to 1860 Munich. Duisburg were in 18th and last place at the time of the sacking. He finished with a record of 22 wins, 15 draws, and 17 losses.

FSV Frankfurt
On 7 March 2017, he was appointed as the new manager of FSV Frankfurt. He was sacked at the end of the season.

Return to Duisburg
After a stint in Poland at Korona Kielce, he returned to MSV Duisburg on 11 November 2020. He was sacked on 27 January 2021.

Managerial statistics

References

External links

Swiss football managers
Italian football managers
Living people
1966 births
Footballers from Zürich
FC Augsburg managers
MSV Duisburg managers
SV Wacker Burghausen managers
SV Darmstadt 98 managers
Bonner SC managers
FSV Frankfurt managers
Korona Kielce managers
2. Bundesliga managers
Expatriate football managers in Germany
Italian expatriate sportspeople in Germany
Swiss expatriate sportspeople in Germany
3. Liga managers